Disease Informatics is the application of Information science in defining the diseases with least error, identifying most of the targets to combat a cluster of diseases (Disease Causal Chain), and designing a holistic solution (Health strategy) to the problem.

References

Health informatics
Computational fields of study